Who We Are may refer to:

Music

Albums
 Who We Are (Hope Partlow album) or the title song, 2005
 Who We Are (Lifehouse album) or the title song, 2007
 Who We Are (EP), by Flyleaf, 2013
 Who We Are, a 1998 album by Ex-Idols

Songs
 "Who We Are" (Imagine Dragons song), 2013
 "Who We Are" (Jessika song), representing San Marino at Eurovision 2018
 "Who We Are" (Switchfoot song), 2013
 "Who We Are", by All Things New from The Good News, 2015
 "Who We Are", by Boyzone from BZ20, 2013
 "Who We Are", by Camel from I Can See Your House from Here, 1979
 "Who We Are", by the Cheetah Girls from TCG, 2007
 "Who We Are", by Jessica Simpson, 2010
 "Who We Are", by Machine Head from Unto the Locust, 2011
 "Who We Are", by Red from Until We Have Faces, 2011
 "Who We Are", by Uncle Kracker from Midnight Special, 2012

Other uses
 "Who We Are" (Private Practice), a television episode
 Who We Are: A Citizen's Manifesto, a 2009 book by Rudyard Griffiths

See also
 This Is Who We Are (disambiguation)